An alkanediol, composed of alkane and diol, are a group of substances consisting of linear or branched hydrocarbon chains containing exactly two hydroxy groups at different positions. They are a subgroup of the diols and contain no other heteroatoms or multiple bonds.